Hunderfossen Station is a railway station located at the village of Hunderfossen in Lillehammer, Norway. The station is located on the Dovre Line and served express trains to Oslo and Trondheim. The station was opened in 1986 and serves the areas of Øyer, the Hafjell skiing resort and Hunderfossen Family Park. During the 1994 Winter Olympics it served Hafjell and the Lillehammer Olympic Bobsleigh and Luge Track.

Railway stations in Oppland
Railway stations on the Dovre Line
Railway stations opened in 1986
1986 establishments in Norway
Buildings and structures in Lillehammer